The Elizabeth Blackwell Medal is awarded annually by the American Medical Women's Association. The medal is named in honor of Elizabeth Blackwell, the first woman to receive a medical degree in the United States and a pioneer in promoting the education of women in medicine. Established by Elise S. L'Esperance in 1949, 100 years after Blackwell received her medical degree, the medal is granted to a woman physician "who has made the most outstanding contributions to the cause of women in the field of medicine." Before 1993, the medal was only awarded to members of the AMWA.

Recipients
Source: AMWA

See also

 List of medicine awards
 List of prizes, medals, and awards for women in science
 List of prizes named after people

Notes

Further reading

External links
Elizabeth Blackwell Award

Medicine awards
Science awards honoring women
Awards established in 1949